"It's a Raid" is a song by English heavy metal musician Ozzy Osbourne featuring from American rapper and singer Post Malone, based on an incident where, during a drug-fuelled party, Osbourne mistakenly activated a silent alarm believing the button was for the air conditioning, resulting in the police suddenly showing up. The song was written by Osbourne, Malone, Chad Smith, Ali Tamposi, and producers Andrew Watt & Louis Bell. The track was released on 20 February 2020 as the fourth single from Osbourne's twelfth studio album, Ordinary Man (2020). It preceded the release of the album by a day. It is the second collaboration between Osbourne and Malone, after "Take What You Want" (with Travis Scott) from Malone's third studio album, Hollywood's Bleeding (2019), in September 2019. It was likely recorded at the time when Osbourne, Malone, and Scott were in the studio recording "Take What You Want".

Personnel
Credits adapted from Tidal.

 Ozzy Osbourne – vocalist, songwriting
 Post Malone – vocalist, songwriting
 Andrew Watt – production, songwriting, lead guitar
 Louis Bell – recording, production, vocal production
 Chad Smith – drums
 Paul Lamalfa – recording
 Manny Marroquin – mixing
 Chris Galland – mixing assistance
 Robin Florent – mixing assistance
 Scott Desmarais – mixing assistance
 Mike Bozzi – mastering

Charts

References 

Ozzy Osbourne songs
Post Malone songs
2020 songs
2020 singles
Republic Records singles
Male vocal duets
Songs written by Ozzy Osbourne
Songs written by Post Malone
Songs written by Louis Bell
Songs written by Chad Smith
Songs written by Ali Tamposi
Songs written by Andrew Watt (record producer)
Song recordings produced by Louis Bell
Song recordings produced by Andrew Watt (record producer)